The Jelebu District (Negeri Sembilan Malay: Jolobu) is the second largest district in Negeri Sembilan, Malaysia after Jempol, with a population over 40,000. Jelebu borders on the Seremban District to its west and Kuala Pilah District to its south, Jempol District to its southeast, Bentong and Bera Districts, Pahang to its east and Hulu Langat District, Selangor to the north. Jelebu is a suburban district with blossoming semi-agricultural industry. Jelebu is also a parliamentary constituency of the Dewan Rakyat in the Malaysian Parliament. Kuala Klawang is the principal town of the district.

Jelebu has an infamous recorded history of British and Japanese colonization as compared to other parts of Negeri Sembilan. Numerous priceless colonial artefacts were discovered in the small semi-agricultural town of Sungai Muntoh, which was once a prosperous mining town a century ago. These artefacts are now displayed in the state museum. Titi and neighbouring Sungai Muntoh were the most developed towns of all mining sites in Jelebu. The booming tin industry was one of the main reasons for the massacre in Titi, where more than 1,500 people, mainly Chinese, were killed. Altogether, about 5,000 people were killed by the Japanese-led army during World War II.

Geography and climate

The Titiwangsa Mountains, the longest mountain range in Malaysia, transverses through Jelebu District. As a result, most of its terrain are generally heavily forested and mountainous, specifically on its northern and western regions. The eastern and southern parts of the district are relatively flat, where agriculture flourished. Jelebu District is home to Negeri Sembilan's tallest mountain, Mount Besar Hantu (1,462 m), near the border with Pahang. Other significant peaks within the district are Mounts Telapak Buruk (1,193 m) and Berembun (1,014 m), both located along the border with Seremban District. The Pasoh Caves, the southernmost limestone cave complex in Malaysia, is also located in Jelebu. The Pasoh Caves are also known for being the first Paleolithic site in southern Peninsular Malaysia, as well as the southernmost in Malaysia.

Jelebu has the warmest climate recorded in Malaysian history. The southwestern part of Jelebu is considered as the driest place in Malaysia. However, in the mornings the temperatures are quite low and visibility is moderate due to the foggy climate.

Administrative divisions

Jelebu District is divided into 8 mukims, which are:
 Glami Lemi
 Kenaboi
 Kuala Klawang (Capital)
 Peradong
 Pertang
 Triang Hilir
 Ulu Klawang
 Ulu Triang

Demographics

Economy
The rubber and mining business made Malaya as one of the richest in natural resources during the British colonial period. Jelebu was one such district that produced some of the world's best quality rubber and steel. Pineapple production there is ranked one of the top in Peninsular Malaysia. For some unknown reasons, Jelebu is home to some of the state's biggest and most advanced rehabilitation centres.

Jelebu is also a major hub for ecotourism, with the presence of nature reserves such as Jeram Toi, FRIM Pasoh, and Kenaboi State Park.

Politics
Currently Jelebu constituency is represented in the Dewan Rakyat by Dato' Jalaluddin Bin Alias of UMNO, the leading party of the federal opposition coalition Barisan Nasional.

In turn, Jelebu contributes 4 seats to the Negeri Sembilan State Legislative Assembly:
 Chennah;
 Kuala Klawang;
 Pertang; and
 Sungai Lui.

Sungai Lui constituency is part of Jelebu parliamentary constituency but in district administration, it was part of the Jempol District and therefore in the local government level it was administered by the Jempol District Council, which was formed on 28 August 1980 through the merger of the Kuala Klawang Town Board and the local councils of Titi and Pertang.

Federal Parliament and State Assembly Seats

List of Jelebu district representatives in the Federal Parliament (Dewan Rakyat) 

List of Jelebu district representatives in the State Legislative Assembly (Dewan Undangan Negeri)

Tourist attractions

 Customs Museum is a museum in Kuala Klawang which exhibits facets and lifestyle of the Malaysian people and identity of Negeri Sembilan. It was constructed in 2005 and officially opened on 2 February 2008 by Negeri Sembilan Chief Minister Mohamad Hasan and Minister for Culture, Arts and Heritage Rais Yatim. The museum is housed in a four-story building, with a giant replica of Malay headdress at the top of its entrance and consists of four galleries, which are: Introduction of custom, Life cycle, Intellectual tradition, government and power and Pepatih customs.
 Kuala Klawang Memorial or Martin Lister Memorial is a memorial in Kuala Klawang built to honouring Queen Victoria's Diamond Jubilee.

Gallery

See also
 Districts of Malaysia

References